Major-General James Michael Shaw CBE is a former British Army officer who became General Officer Commanding, Theatre Troops.

Military career
Shaw was commissioned into the Royal Corps of Signals in 1972. He served as commanding officer of 14 Signal Regiment (Electronic Warfare) during the Gulf War in 1991. He went on to be commander of 1st Signal Brigade which was deployed to Bosnia in 1996, Commander Communications and Information Systems at Headquarters Land Command in 1998 and then became General Officer Commanding, Theatre Troops in 2001 before retiring in January 2005.

References

British Army generals
Royal Corps of Signals officers
NATO personnel in the Bosnian War
Commanders of the Order of the British Empire
Living people
Year of birth missing (living people)
British Army personnel of the Gulf War